The 2001 Tennessee Titans season was the Titans' 42nd season and their 32nd in the National Football League. The team won only seven games, and failed to qualify for the playoffs for the first time since 1998. After finishing 13–3 in the two prior seasons, defensive coordinator Gregg Williams was hired as the new head coach of the Buffalo Bills. Williams' departure contributed to the dropoff in wins, as the Titans went from second in scoring defense in 2000 to 25th in 2001.

Offseason

NFL Draft

Personnel

Staff

Roster

Schedule

Preseason

Regular season

Standings

References 

 Titans on Pro Football Reference
 Titans on jt-sw.com

Tennessee Titans
Tennessee Titans seasons
Titans